Mykola Vlaev (born 21 January 1984) is a Ukrainian professional footballer who plays as a midfielder.

Player career
Vlaev is a product of Dynamo Kyiv, starting with Dynamo-3 Kyiv where he played 18 matches. Beginning in 2003, he began a career that saw him play for a series of lower-level and amateur clubs, ranging from CSKA Kyiv to Dnister Ovidiopol and FC Chernihiv. He last played for Desna Pohreby in 2020.

Honours
Desna Pohreby
 Kyiv Region Cup: 2017
 Kyiv Oblast Football Federation: Runner-up 2016

Dinaz Vyshhorod
 Football cup of Kyiv Oblast: 2012, 2015

Yednist Plysky
 Ukrainian Amateur Cup: Runner-up 2013

References

External links
 Mykola Vlaev at upl.ua 
 Mykola Vlaev at soccerway.com 

1984 births
Living people
FC Chernihiv players
FC CSKA Kyiv players
FC Dynamo-3 Kyiv players
MFC Mykolaiv players
FC Stal Kamianske players
FC Yednist Plysky players
FC Dinaz Vyshhorod players
FC Desna Pohreby players
FC Dnister Ovidiopol players
Ukrainian footballers
Association football central defenders
Ukrainian First League players